Bezirk Neusiedl am See is a district of the state of 
Burgenland in Austria.

Municipalities
Towns (Städte) are indicated in boldface; market towns (Marktgemeinden) in italics; suburbs, hamlets and other subdivisions of a municipality are indicated in small characters.
Where appropriate, the Croatian names are given in parentheses.
 Andau (2,366)
 Apetlon (1,804)
 Bruckneudorf (2,889)
 Kaisersteinbruch, Königshof (Bgld)
 Deutsch Jahrndorf (597)
 Edelstal (632)
 Frauenkirchen (2,833)
 Gattendorf (1,213)
 Gols (3,744)
 Halbturn (1,885)
 Illmitz (2,416)
 Jois (1,438)
 Kittsee (Gijeca) (2,310)
 Mönchhof (2,276)
 Neudorf bei Parndorf (Novo Selo) (715)
 Neusiedl am See (7,127)
 Nickelsdorf (1,643)
 Pama (Bijelo Selo) (1,090)
 Pamhagen (1,661)
 Parndorf (Pandrof) (4,214)
 Podersdorf am See (2,098)
 Potzneusiedl (527)
 Sankt Andrä am Zicksee (1,372)
 Tadten (1,254)
 Wallern im Burgenland (1,789)
 Weiden am See (2,255)
 Winden am See (1,281)
 Zurndorf (2,062)

 
Districts of Burgenland